Mario Domínguez (born December 1, 1975, in Mexico City) is a Mexican racing driver. He has competed in the CART and CCWS Champ Car series and later the IndyCar Series.

Early career
Domínguez first began racing in 1987 driving go-karts.  He won three go-karting championships and represented Mexico in the World Karting Championships in Spain (1989), Italy (1990) and France (1991). He then raced in numerous developmental series in Mexico, eventually winning the Mexican Formula Three Championship in 1998 and moving to the American Indy Lights series full-time in 1999, finishing 8th in the championship in 2000 and 4th in the series' final year, 2001. He was slated to make his Champ Car debut in the first race of the 2001 season in his home county's race in Monterrey for the new Millennium Motorsports team, but the car never appeared.

Champ Car

Domínguez made his Champ Car debut the following year in 2002 and became Rookie of the Year, with his first Champ Car victory in 2002 at the Honda Indy 300, although this was in a rain-shortened race largely dictated by the safety car. He was more competitive in 2003, winning the Grand Prix Americas in Miami.  In 2004 Domínguez had his best season to date by finishing 5th in the final standings.  This success with Herdez Competition allowed him to sign with the Forsythe team for 2005. However, Domínguez saw limited success at Forsythe. After the first four races of the 2006 season where he crashed into his teammate Paul Tracy on the first lap twice, Domínguez and Forsythe parted ways. Before the next Champ Car race in Portland, Domínguez signed on to Dale Coyne Racing to drive the Sonny's BBQ Ford Lola-Cosworth. For the final 3 races of the season, Domínguez secured sponsorship from Mexican state-owned petroleum company Pemex to race for the slightly more competitive Rocketsports team. Along with Champ Car racing, Mario tested a Jordan Grand Prix Formula One racing car at the Silverstone circuit in Northamptonshire, England, in 2005.

In 2007 he signed with Forsythe for the first three races of the season after obtaining sponsorship from Telmex, but was dropped after just a few rounds in favour of Oriol Servià.  He remained out of a Champ Car ride until he replaced an injured Tristan Gommendy at PKV Racing at the Rexall Grand Prix of Edmonton.  The following week at the San Jose Grand Prix, he signed on with Pacific Coast Motorsports to fill in for Ryan Dalziel, who was injured in a bicycling accident.  Dalziel recovered enough to return to racing two weeks later at Generac Grand Prix at Road America, returning Mario to the sidelines.  But at the Belgian Grand Prix at Zolder, Mario was again called on as a substitute after Dan Clarke of Minardi Team USA was suspended for the weekend after causing a multi-car crash in a practice session.

IndyCar Series

In 2008, Dominguez announced that he would enter the remainder of the 2008 IndyCar Series season with Pacific Coast Motorsports, after placing third in the final Champ Car race at Long Beach. He was bumped from the field at the 2008 Indianapolis 500 and made his first true start in the series in the following race at the Milwaukee Mile. Since his 21st-place finish at Texas Motor Speedway in June, Dominguez's team skipped the next events to re-evaluate their program to be more competitive when they return. They returned on a road course only schedule and participated in the Watkins Glen, Mid-Ohio, Edmonton, and Infineon races to close out the season. His best finish of the season came at Watkins Glen in 13th place. He finished 27th in points.

FIA GT

In 2009, Mario has been offered a drive for the K Plus K Motorsport without the need to bring sponsorship. This will not be his first sportscar events, since he did a couple for a Risi Competizione American Le Mans Series team in 2006, delivering good results.

Motorsports Career Results

American open–wheel racing results
(key) (Races in bold indicate pole position) (Races in italics indicate fastest lap)

Indy Lights

CART/Champ Car

 ^ New points system implemented in 2004

IndyCar Series

 1 Run on same day.
 2 Non-points-paying, exhibition race.

References

 Forsythe Signs Dominguez (March 30, 2005)
 Champ Car Veteran Mario Dominguez Joins Pacific Coast Motorsports (July 25, 2007)

External links

 Mario Dominguez profile provided by CBS SportsLine

1975 births
Living people
Champ Car drivers
Indy Lights drivers
IndyCar Series drivers
Mexican Formula Three Championship drivers
Mexican racing drivers
FIA GT Championship drivers
Racing drivers from Mexico City
American Le Mans Series drivers
Culver Academies alumni
Forsythe Racing drivers
Dale Coyne Racing drivers
KV Racing Technology drivers
PacWest Racing drivers
HVM Racing drivers
Rocketsports Racing drivers